Beijiao Railway Station, is an elevated station of Guangzhou-Zhuhai Intercity Railway.

The station is located at Taocun Village, Beijiao Town in Shunde District, Foshan, Guangdong, China, the west of Bigui Lu and the east of Sanle Lu. It is away from Beijiao Town Centre with few road infrastructure facilities nearby. Roads will be constructed to connect to the station to cope with the needs of the neighbouring Panyu District. It started operations on 7 January 2011.

References

Shunde District
Railway stations in China opened in 2011